Dumas is a town in Tippah County, Mississippi. The population was 470 at the 2010 census.

Geography
Dumas is located at  (34.634549, -88.847800).

Demographics

2020 census

As of the 2020 United States census, there were 471 people, 160 households, and 110 families residing in the town.

2000 census
As of the census of 2000, there were 452 people, 181 households, and 133 families residing in the town.  The population density was 116.0 inhabitants per square mile (44.7/km2).  There were 192 housing units at an average density of 19.0 inhabitants/km2 (49.3 inhabitants/mi2).  The racial makeup of the town was 98.67% White, 0.00% African American, 0.00% Native American, 0.00% Asian, 0.00% Pacific Islander, 1.33% from other races, and 0.00% from two or more races.  1.77% of the population were Hispanic or Latino of any race.

There were 181 households, out of which 34.3% had children under the age of 18 living with them, 63.0% were married couples living together, 7.7% had a woman whose husband does not live with her, and 26.0% were non-families. 24.3% of all households were made up of individuals, and 11.0% had someone living alone who was 65 years of age or older.  The average household size was 2.50 and the average family size was 2.99.

In the town, the population was spread out, with 25.4% under the age of 18, 8.2% from 18 to 24, 29.2% from 25 to 44, 24.8% from 45 to 64, and 12.4% who were 65 years of age or older.  The median age was 36 years.  For every 100 females, there were 101.8 males.  For every 100 females age 18 and over, there were 103.0 males.

The median income for a household in the town was $32,250, and the median income for a family was $40,391. Males had a median income of $30,179 versus $20,341 for females. The per capita income for the town was $13,121.  14.0% of the population and 13.0% of families were below the poverty line.  Out of the total people living in poverty, 14.5% were under the age of 18 and 33.3% were 65 or older.

Education
The Town of Dumas is served by the South Tippah School District.

Locals
Donald Wildmon, the head of the American Family Association was born in Dumas on January 18, 1938.

References

External links

Towns in Tippah County, Mississippi
Towns in Mississippi